Mark Stephen Howard (born 21 September 1986) is an English professional footballer who plays as a goalkeeper for Wrexham.

Born in Southwark, London, Howard was part of Arsenal's youth team, but having failed to make the step up to the senior squad he departed for Cardiff City. He moved to Scotland, with spells at St Mirren and Aberdeen, before moving back to England to play for Blackpool, Sheffield United (for whom he holds the club's consecutive clean-sheet record of eight games) and Bolton Wanderers. He returned to Blackpool in 2018 and remained there for two years, during which he had a loan spell at Salford City. He has since had spells at Scunthorpe United, Carlisle United and Wrexham.

Career

Early career
Howard started his career with Arsenal, but he never made an appearance for the first team, although he was an unused substitute during the 2005 FA Community Shield. He was loaned to Scottish Premier League club Falkirk in January 2006, for whom he made eight appearances. After his loan period ended in the summer, Howard was released by Arsenal.

Cardiff City
Following his release by the Gunners, Howard was offered a permanent contract with Falkirk, but he instead decided to join Cardiff City. He provided backup as a second-choice keeper that season to Neil Alexander. He made his debut for The Bluebirds in a Football League Cup tie against Barnet

After a month's loan with Swansea City, as cover in January 2007, he was released by Cardiff at the end of the 2006–07 season.

St Mirren
Howard joined Scottish side St Mirren and made his debut on 13 February 2008, keeping a clean sheet against Dundee United in a Scottish Cup match. He then made his league debut three days later as St Mirren suffered a 4–0 defeat against Falkirk. Howard soon become first-choice goalkeeper, taking over from Chris Smith and his performances led to him signing a new two-year contract in April 2009. The following season, however, Howard made only two appearances, after losing his first-choice status to new signing Paul Gallacher, and left the club after three seasons and 52 games.

Aberdeen
In July 2010, Howard signed a one-year deal with Aberdeen and made his debut on 14 August 2010, keeping a clean sheet in a 4–0 win over Hamilton Academical. As the season progressed, Howard slipped to second-choice behind Jamie Langfield and left the club when the season ended.

Blackpool
Howard signed a five-month contract with Blackpool in September 2011 as cover after fitness concerns over Matt Gilks and Mark Halstead. He had to wait until Boxing Day later that year to make his full début for the club, in a 3–1 victory at Barnsley. He went on to make three more appearances, his performances prompting manager Ian Holloway to offer him an extension for the rest of the season, but Howard failed to agree terms and left Bloomfield Road when his short-term deal expired.

Sheffield United
In February 2012, Howard joined Sheffield United on a free transfer, signing a -year contract after a successful two-week trial period, arriving as cover for Steve Simonsen. He did not make a first-team appearance that season. When Simonsen was released the following summer, Howard made his United debut, against Shrewsbury Town on 18 August 2012, keeping a clean sheet in a single-goal victory. Howard remained first-choice keeper until he suffered a thigh injury in the eleventh minute at Matchroom Stadium against Leyton Orient in October 2012, an injury that kept him out of the side for twelve weeks. Replaced by George Long, Howard was unable to regain his place in the team, despite having started the 2012–13 season as first-choice. The following season initially saw Howard continue to play understudy to Long, making only a handful of appearances until he was recalled to the starting lineup by new manager Nigel Clough for an FA Cup tie against Fulham in February 2014. Having kept a clean sheet in that fixture, Howard retained his place and was virtually ever-present until the end of the season, missing only one game. With his current deal set to expire, United opted to take up a one-year extension in May 2014.

Bolton Wanderers
On 13 July 2016, Howard signed a two-year contract with Bolton Wanderers after leaving Sheffield United at the end of the previous season. On 24 May 2018, Bolton confirmed that Howard would leave the club on 30 June, when his contract came to an end.

Blackpool
Howard re-joined Blackpool following his release from Bolton. On 5 July 2018, he signed a two-year deal with the Tangerines. He was released in June 2020.

Salford City
Howard joined Salford City in a seven-day emergency loan on 22 October 2019. The loan was renewed on 29 October.

Scunthorpe United
On 22 October 2020, Howard joined League Two side Scunthorpe United on a deal until the end of the season.

Carlisle United
Howard signed for  Carlisle United on 14 October 2021. Howard was released at the end of the 2021–22 season, despite having won the Player of the Season award.

Wrexham 
Howard signed a one year deal at Wrexham on 5 July 2022 following the expiry of his contract at Carlisle.

International career
Although Howard did not win any official caps for either England, or any of its youth teams, he did appear as a substitute in an unofficial England fixture in 2004, as part of a testimonial for former Arsenal defender Martin Keown. England lost 6–0.

Career statistics

Honours
Bolton Wanderers
EFL League One runner-up: 2016–17

Individual
Carlisle United Player of the Year: 2021–22

References

External links

Sheffield United Official player profile

1986 births
Living people
Footballers from Southwark
English footballers
Association football goalkeepers
Arsenal F.C. players
Falkirk F.C. players
Cardiff City F.C. players
Swansea City A.F.C. players
St Mirren F.C. players
Aberdeen F.C. players
Blackpool F.C. players
Sheffield United F.C. players
Bolton Wanderers F.C. players
Salford City F.C. players
Scunthorpe United F.C. players
Carlisle United F.C. players
Wrexham A.F.C. players
English Football League players
Scottish Premier League players